John Augustus Swope (December 25, 1827 – December 6, 1910) was a Democratic member of the U.S. House of Representatives from Pennsylvania.

Swope was born in Gettysburg, Pennsylvania.  He attended the common schools at Gettysburg and Mount St. Mary’s Academy in Emmitsburg, Maryland.  He graduated from Princeton College in 1847 and from the medical department of the University of Pennsylvania at Philadelphia, but discontinued the practice of medicine after a few years and engaged in mercantile pursuits in Baltimore, Maryland.  He returned to Gettysburg and became president of the Gettysburg National Bank in 1879.  He was also engaged in manufacturing and agricultural pursuits.

Swope was elected in 1884 as a Democrat to the Forty-eighth Congress to fill the vacancy caused by the death of William A. Duncan, serving from December 23, 1884 through March 3, 1885.  He was subsequently elected in 1885 to the Forty-ninth Congress to fill the vacancy caused by the death of Mr. Duncan, who had been reelected, and served from November 3, 1885 through March 3, 1887.  He was not a candidate for renomination in 1886.

He moved to Washington, D.C., and engaged in banking until his death there in 1910.  He was interred in Evergreen Cemetery in Gettysburg, Pennsylvania.

Sources

The Political Graveyard

External links 
 

1827 births
1910 deaths
Princeton University alumni
Perelman School of Medicine at the University of Pennsylvania alumni
People from Gettysburg, Pennsylvania
Burials at Evergreen Cemetery (Adams County, Pennsylvania)
American bank presidents
Democratic Party members of the United States House of Representatives from Pennsylvania
19th-century American politicians
19th-century American businesspeople